Nao (pronounced now) is an autonomous, programmable humanoid robot formerly developed by Aldebaran Robotics, a French robotics company headquartered in Paris, which was acquired by SoftBank Group in 2015 and rebranded as SoftBank Robotics. The robot's development began with the launch of Project Nao in 2004. On 15 August 2007, Nao replaced Sony's robot dog Aibo as the robot used in the RoboCup Standard Platform League (SPL), an international robot soccer competition. The Nao was used in RoboCup 2008 and 2009, and the NaoV3R was chosen as the platform for the SPL at RoboCup 2010.

Several versions of the robot have been released since 2008. The Nao Academics Edition was developed for universities and laboratories for research and education purposes. It was released to institutions in 2008, and was made publicly available by 2011. Various upgrades to the Nao platform have since been released, including the 2011 Nao Next Gen and the 2014 Nao Evolution.

Nao robots have been used for research and education purposes in numerous academic institutions worldwide. As of 2015, over 5,000 Nao units are in use in more than 50 countries.

Development history
Aldebaran Robotics was established in 2005 by Bruno Maisonnier, who had previously begun developing the robot under "Project Nao" in 2004. Six prototypes of Nao were designed between 2005 and 2007. In March 2008, the first production version of the robot, the Nao RoboCup Edition, was released to the contestants of that year's RoboCup. The Nao Academics Edition was released to universities, educational institutions and research laboratories in late 2008.

In the summer of 2010, Nao made global headlines with a synchronized dance routine at the Shanghai Expo in China. In October 2010, the University of Tokyo purchased 30 Nao robots for their Nakamura Lab, with hopes of developing the robots into active laboratory assistants. In December 2010, a Nao robot was demonstrated doing a stand-up comedy routine, and a new version of the robot was released, featuring sculpted arms and improved motors. In May 2011, Aldebaran announced that it would release Nao's controlling source code to the public as open source software. In June 2011, Aldebaran raised US$13 million in a round of venture funding led by Intel Capital. In 2013, Aldebaran was acquired by Japan's SoftBank Mobile for US$100 million.

In December 2011, Aldebaran released the Nao Next Gen, featuring hardware and software enhancements such as high density cameras, improved robustness, anti-collision systems and a faster walking speed. The Nao Evolution, featuring enhanced durability, improved multilingual speech synthesis, improved shape and facial detection and recognition using new algorithms, and improved sound source location using four directional microphones, was released in June 2014.

Aldeberan Robotics was acquired by SoftBank Group in 2015 and rebranded as SoftBank Robotics.

Academic and scientific usage
Since 2011, over 200 academic institutions worldwide have made use of the robot, including the University of Hertfordshire and their Bold Hearts RoboCup Team, the Indian Institute of Information Technology, Allahabad, the University of Tokyo, the Indian Institute of Technology Kanpur, Saudi Arabia's King Fahd University of Petroleum and Minerals, University of South Wales and Montana State University. In 2012, donated Nao robots were used to teach autistic children in a UK school; some of the children found the childlike, expressive robots more relatable than human beings. In a broader context, Nao robots have been used by numerous British schools to introduce children to robots and the robotics industry.

By the end of 2014, over 5,000 Nao robots were in use with educational and research institutions in 70 countries. In 2015, Mitsubishi UFJ Financial Group began trialling Nao robots for customer service use in its Japanese bank branches. In July 2015, Nao robots were shown to demonstrate a basic form of self-awareness in a philosophical experiment at Rensselaer Polytechnic Institute in New York, in which three robots were set up, muting two of them; they were then told that two of them had been given a "dumbing pill", and asked to figure out which of them hadn't. After initially replying he didn't know, the non-muted robot was able to figure out he hadn't been given the dumbing pill after hearing the sound of his own voice. In September 2015, the French Institute of Health and Medical Research used Nao robots to test a system of robotic "autobiographical memory" designed to help train International Space Station crews and assist elderly patients.

Nao is available as a research robot for schools, colleges and universities to teach programming and conduct research into human-robot interactions.

In August 2018, RobotLAB released an online learning platform for schools that enhance the use of NAO for STEM, Coding and Engineering.

Healthcare usage
Since its release in 2004, Nao has been tested and deployed in a number of healthcare scenarios, including usage in care homes and in schools.

Design
The various versions of the Nao robotics platform feature either 2, 14, 21 or 25 degrees of freedom (DoF). A specialised model with 21 DoF and no actuated hands was created for the Robocup competition. All Nao Academics versions feature an inertial measurement unit with accelerometer, gyrometer and four ultrasonic sensors that provide Nao with stability and positioning within space. The legged versions included eight force-sensing resistors and two bumpers. The 2014 Nao Evolution, featured stronger metallic joints, improved grip and an enhanced sound source location system that utilises four directional microphones. The most recent version, dubbed NAO6, was introduced in June 2018.

Software
The Nao robot is controlled by a specialised Linux-based operating system, dubbed NAOqi. The OS powers the robot's multimedia system, which includes four microphones (for voice recognition and sound localization), two speakers (for multilingual text-to-speech synthesis) and two HD cameras (for computer vision, including facial and shape recognition). The robot also comes with a software suite that includes a graphical programming tool dubbed Choregraphe, a simulation software package and a software developer's kit. Nao is furthermore compatible with the Microsoft Robotics Studio, Cyberbotics Webots, and the Gostai Studio (URBI).

In August 2018, RobotLAB released Engage! K12. It is an online learning platform for schools that enhance the use of NAO for STEM, Coding and Engineering. In February 2018, Finnish company Utelias Technologies released Elias Robot, a learning application that helps to learn languages with NAO.

Specifications

See also
Aldebaran Robotics (French Wikipedia)
Educational robotics

Related development 
Romeo (French Wikipedia)
Pepper (robot)

Robots of comparable role, configuration, dimensions and era 
Atlas (robot)
Kirobo
Manav (robot)
ICub
InMoov
QRIO
REEM
Robotis Bioloid

References

External links

 and YouTube channel

Blanca Li dance performance with Nao robot (World Science Festival)
Barboza Space Center (The Occupy Mars Learning Adventures Projects with Nao) www.BarbozaSpaceCenter.com

Bipedal humanoid robots
Robots of France
Soccer robots
Educational robots
Entertainment robots
2008 robots
Articles containing video clips